Maksym Chekh (born 3 January 1999) is a Ukrainian professional footballer who plays as a midfielder for Sabail, on loan from Shakhtar Donetsk.

Career
Born in Velyka Novosilka Raion, Donetsk Oblast, Chekh is a product of Shakhtar Donetsk youth system.

He made his debut for FC Mariupol in the Ukrainian Premier League against FC Kolos Kovalivka on 30 July 2019.

International career
Chekh was part of the Ukraine national under-20 football team that won the 2019 FIFA U-20 World Cup, appearing in all seven of his team's matches.

Honours

International 
Ukraine U20
 FIFA U-20 World Cup: 2019

References

External links
 

1999 births
Living people
Sportspeople from Donetsk Oblast
Ukrainian footballers
FC Shakhtar Donetsk players
FC Mariupol players
Sabail FK players
Ukrainian Premier League players
Association football midfielders
Ukraine youth international footballers
Ukraine under-21 international footballers
Ukrainian expatriate footballers
Expatriate footballers in Azerbaijan
Ukrainian expatriate sportspeople in Azerbaijan